The Wicomico River is a  tributary of the lower tidal portion of the Potomac River located in the U.S. state of Maryland south of Washington, DC. The river empties into the Potomac at Cobb Island and St. Margaret's Island. The lower section of the river forms part of the boundary between Charles and St. Mary's counties. The Wicomico River was designated as a Scenic River under the Maryland Scenic River Act in 1968; Scenic River Commissions oversee it in both Charles and St. Mary's counties (see links below).

Tributaries 
Allens Fresh Run
Willmer Creek
Cramer Gut
Posey Creek
Tears Gut
Steinhauser Gut
Bunker Hill Branch
Foggy Bottoms Gut
Colby Run
Newport Marsh Run
Newport Run
Hickory Gut
St. Clair Gut
Murphy Run
Hodister Run
Lloyd Drain
Bowling Gut
Budds Creek
Chaptico Bay
Chaptico Run
Burroughs Run
Bull Run
Maddox Creek
Charleston Creek
Neale Sound

References

External links 
Wicomico Scenic River Commission--St. Mary's County
Wicomico Scenic River Commission--Charles County

Rivers of Charles County, Maryland
Rivers of Maryland
Rivers of St. Mary's County, Maryland
Tributaries of the Potomac River